This page is a list of flamethrowers of all forms from all around the world.

Human portable

Vehicle mounted

Static

See also

 List of pistols
 List of revolvers
 List of assault rifles
 List of sniper rifles
 List of machine guns
 List of firearms
 List of weapons

References

Flamethrowers